Brachycybe lecontii is a species of millipede in the family Andrognathidae. It is found in North America.

References

Further reading

External links

 

Millipedes of North America
Animals described in 1864
Platydesmida